The Ministry of Interior of Hungary is a part of the Hungarian state organisation. Its head, the Minister of the Interior, is a member of the Hungarian cabinet. The ministry was established in 1848.

Between 2006 and 2010 the ministry was split into the Ministry of Local Government and the Ministry of Justice and Law. In 2010 the prior organization was restored.

In the early 1980s, there were four separate internal security forces under the Ministry of Interior. These included the Internal Security Troops (Belső Karahatálom); the State Security Authority (Államvelédelmi Hatoság, ÁVH)'s Security Police, the Frontier Guard or Border Guard (Határőrség, HO, :hu:Határőrség Magyarországon), wearing army uniforms, 15,000 strong; and the Workers' Militia (Munkás Őrség, MO). By mid-1986 it was estimated that the Frontier Guards were 16,000 strong, with 11,000 conscripts, divided into 11 districts.

See also 
 Constitution Protection Office

References

External links
 Official website  
 Official website 

Government ministries of Hungary